Eva and the Grasshopper (German: Jugendrausch) is a 1927 German silent film directed by Georg Asagaroff and Wladyslaw Starewicz and starring Camilla Horn, Gustav Fröhlich, and Warwick Ward.

The film's art direction was by Erich Czerwonski.

Cast

References

Bibliography
 Alfred Krautz. International directory of cinematographers, set- and costume designers in film, Volume 4. Saur, 1984.

External links

1927 films
Films of the Weimar Republic
German silent feature films
Films directed by Georg Asagaroff
UFA GmbH films
German black-and-white films